Joshua Lautenschlager Kaul (born February 2, 1981) is an American lawyer, politician and member of the Democratic Party who has served as the 45th Attorney General of Wisconsin since January 2019.

Early life and education 
Kaul is the son of Peg Lautenschlager, an attorney and politician, and the Indian immigrant Raj Kaul. His stepfather, Bill Rippl, worked as a police officer. He was raised in Oshkosh and Fond du Lac. Kaul graduated from Yale University as a double major in history and economics. He earned his Juris Doctor from Stanford Law School. While a student at Stanford, he served as President of the Stanford Law Review.

Career 
Kaul clerked for Michael Boudin in the United States Court of Appeals for the First Circuit. From 2007 through 2010, he worked for the law firm Jenner & Block, and worked as a federal prosecutor in the U.S. Attorney's office in Baltimore through 2014.

In 2014, Kaul moved back to Wisconsin and joined the law firm Perkins Coie's Madison office.

Attorney General of Wisconsin 
In the 2018 elections, Kaul ran for Attorney General of Wisconsin defeating incumbent Republican Brad Schimel. Kaul won by a small margin of just over 17,000 votes, but Schimel decided not to seek a recount and conceded defeat on November 19. Kaul became the state's first Democratic Attorney General since his mother's term in office.

Kaul was reelected in 2022 defeating Republican Eric Toney.

Personal life 
Kaul met his wife, Lindsey, at Yale. They have two sons.

Electoral history

References

External links

 Wisconsin Attorney General's Office

Wisconsin Attorneys General
Wisconsin Democrats
Wisconsin lawyers
American politicians of Indian descent
People associated with Jenner & Block
Stanford Law School alumni
Yale University alumni
1980 births
Living people
People associated with Perkins Coie